Peter Snell is a Canadian film producer. He is notable for the films he made with Alistair MacLean, Don Sharp and Charlton Heston as well as The Wicker Man (1973).

Select filmography
The Winter's Tale (1967)
Some May Live (1967)
Subterfuge (1968)
Julius Caesar (1970) - starring Heston
Goodbye Gemini (1970)
Antony and Cleopatra (1972) - starring and directed by Heston
The Wicker Man (1973)
Hennessy (1975) - directed by Sharp
A Month in the County (1977)
Bear Island (1979) - directed by Sharp, based on story by MacLean
The Hostage Tower (1980) - based on story by MacLean
Mother Lode (1982) - starring and directed by Heston
Squaring the Circle (1984)
Turtle Diary (1985)
Lady Jane (1986)
A Prayer for the Dying (1987)
Tears in the Rain (1988) - directed by Sharp
A Man for All Seasons (1988) - directed by Heston
Blood Royal: William the Conqueror (1990)
Treasure Island (1990) - starring Heston
The Crucifer of Blood (1991) - starring Heston
Death Train (1993) - based on story by MacLean
Night Watch (1995) - based on story by MacLean
Letters from a Killer (1998)
The Wicker Tree (2011)
Air Force One Is Down (2013)

References

External links

Peter Snell at British Lion

Canadian film producers
Living people
Year of birth missing (living people)